Ministry of Economy and Trade may refer to:

Ministry of Economy and Trade (Kazakhstan)
Ministry of Economy and Trade (Lebanon)
Ministry of Economy and Trade (Libya)
Ministry of Economy and Trade (Moldova)
Ministry of Economy and Trade (Palestine)
Ministry of Economy and Trade (Syria)